Albuq'  is an airstrip serving the village of Albuq in Yemen.

Caution: The runway is subject to obstruction by drifting sand.

See also
Transport in Yemen

References

 OurAirports - Yemen
  Great Circle Mapper - Albuq
 Albuq
 Google Earth

Airports in Yemen